Marcia may refer to:

People
 Marcia (given name)
James Marcia, Canadian psychologist
Stefano Marcia (born 1993), South African Olympic sailor

Other uses
 Marcia (Beccafumi), a c. 1519 painting by Domenico Beccafumi
 Marcia (bivalve), a genus of Venus clams in the family Veneridae
 Marcia (gens), a Roman gens
 Marcia: Greatest Hits 1975–1983, a 2004 album by Marcia Hines
 Marcia, the Italian musical designation for a march or march tempo

See also
Martia (disambiguation)
Martian (disambiguation)
Mars (disambiguation)
Marzia (disambiguation)
Mercia (disambiguation)